B. C. Manjunath (born in 1976 in Karnataka) is an Indian Mridangam player, active in Indian classical music as well as Jazz and World music genres. He is also known as a practitioner and proponent of Konnakol, including via online videos exploring mathematical structures through the practice, including the Fibonacci Tala. Manjunath has performed at many highly prestigious venues, including Théâtre de la Ville Paris, Queen Elizabeth Hall London, Sydney Opera House, Stanislavsky Moscow, Bangalore Gayana Samaja, Chennai Music Academy, NCPA Mumbai, Onassis cultural centre Athens, The Auditorium Rome and Esplanade Singapore.

References 

Living people
1976 births
Indian classical musicians